Annie Antón is an academic and researcher in the fields of computer science, mathematical logic, and bioinformatics. 

She is a professor in the School of Interactive Computing at Georgia Tech, within its College of Computing. She is the founder and director of ThePrivacyPlace.org, a research center devoted to issues of privacy protection in information systems. She has also held advisory positions in industry and government. 

Antón served as chair of the School of Interactive Computing from 2012 to 2017. From 1998 to 2012, Antón served as a professor of software engineering at North Carolina State University.

Early life and education 
Antón is a Cuban American.  She attended St. Pius X Catholic High School in Atlanta. Despite having dyslexia and attention deficit disorder, she continued on to college, eventually receiving her B.S., M.S. and Ph.D. degrees in computer science from the College of Computing at the Georgia Institute of Technology, finishing in 1997.  She was active in several student organizations, including as a student member of the Georgia Tech National Advisory Board and was an honorary member of the ANAK Society.

Career 
After a year on the faculty of the University of South Florida, Professor Antón joined the faculty at North Carolina State University in 1998.  There, her research and teaching interests were in software engineering (especially requirements engineering), information security, privacy, and public policy.  In 2012, Professor Antón left NCSU to become Chair of Georgia Tech's School of Interactive Computing.

Antón is the founder and director of ThePrivacyPlace.org, a research group of students and faculty at NCSU, Georgia Tech, and Purdue University. She is leading this group in the development of technology to assist practitioners and policymakers in meeting the challenge of eliciting and expressing policies (a form of requirements). These tools help ensure that privacy policies are aligned with the software systems that they govern.

Boards and advisory positions 

2003–2005 Microsoft Research University Relations Advisory Board
 2003–present ACM U.S. Public Policy Committee
 2005–2012 Member of executive committee
 2008 Co-Vice Chair of executive committee
 2011–2012 Vice Chair of executive committee
 2004–2005 IDA/DARPA Defense Science Study Group
 2005–2009 NSF CISE Advisory Council
 2005–2007 CRA Committee on the Status of Women in Computing Research
 2006–2012 Board of Directors of the Computing Research Association
 2006-2012 U.S. Department of Homeland Security Data Privacy and Integrity Advisory Committee (DPIAC)
 2006–present Intel Corporation Special Topics External Review Board
 2007–2010 Georgia Tech Alumni Association Board of Trustees
 2008–present Future of Privacy Forum Advisory Board
 2012–present National Academy of Sciences Future Research Goals and Directions for Foundational Science in Cybersecurity
 2014–present CRA-CCC Privacy by Design Workshop Organizing Committee
 2016–present NIST Information Security and Privacy Advisory Board
 2016–present President's Commission on Enhancing National Cybersecurity

Selected honors 

2000 NSF CAREER Award
 2002 Computing Research Association Digital Government Fellow
 2003 NCSU College of Engineering Pride of the Wolfpack Award
 2005 CSO (Chief Security Officer) Magazine's Woman of Influence in the Public Sector Award
 2009 ACM Distinguished Scientist
 2015 Alpha Delta Pi National Outstanding Alumnae Achievement Award for Contribution to Profession

References

External links 
Antón's Georgia Tech faculty profile
Annie Antón's homepage at NCSU
ThePrivacyPlace

Living people
Georgia Tech alumni
Georgia Tech faculty
American women computer scientists
North Carolina State University faculty
Computer security academics
Scientists with dyslexia
Year of birth missing (living people)
21st-century American women scientists
American computer scientists
21st-century American scientists
American women academics